Joseph Robert Gase (born February 8, 1993) is an American professional stock car racing driver and team owner. He competes part-time in the NASCAR Xfinity Series, driving the Nos. 35 and 53 Ford Mustang and Toyota Supra for Emerling-Gase Motorsports.

Early career and personal life

Gase started racing at Hawkeye Downs Speedway in the track's junior classes in 2001. He won the track modified B championship at La Crosse Fairgrounds Speedway in 2007, the youngest driver to do so. In 2009, he became the youngest driver to win the track's late model championship at Hawkeye Downs Speedway. Gase graduated from Xavier High School in Cedar Rapids in 2011.

Gase's mother, Mary Jo, died from a brain aneurysm when Gase was 18 years old. Gase was awarded the inaugural Comcast Community Champion Award at the joint Xfinity and Camping World Truck Series banquet after the 2015 season. The award was in recognition of Gase's efforts to promote organ donation, to honor his mother, whose donated organs helped 66 others after her death.

NASCAR

Camping World Truck Series
Gase made his Truck Series debut at Atlanta, driving a start and park truck for Jennifer Jo Cobb Racing. He started 26th and finished 31st.

On September 28, 2018, it was announced that Gase joined Copp Motorsports for one race at Talladega with Sparks Energy being the sponsor.

Xfinity Series
After running a limited schedule of American Speed Association races starting in 2008, and selected ARCA Racing Series, USAR Pro Cup Series, and NASCAR K&N Pro Series East races in 2010 and 2011, Gase made his first start in NASCAR's Nationwide Series at Iowa Speedway in August 2011. Driving for Go Green Racing in the No. 39 Ford, Gase made five starts during the second half of the 2011 season; throughout those races, he posted the best finish of 20th and an average finish of 25th.

In January 2012, it was announced that Gase would drive the No. 39 Ford for Go Green Racing for the entire 2012 Nationwide Series season, competing for rookie of the year honors. Gase was planned to be the lead driver of a two-car team for Go Green Racing; the team's second car, the No. 04, would be driven by several drivers. A lack of sponsorship meant that Gase only ran a partial season, competing for several teams.

In December 2012, Gase announced that he would be driving for Jimmy Means Racing full-time in the Nationwide Series for 2013; partway through the season he began running for Go Green Racing as well as Means due to a lack of sponsorship.

In the 2015 race at Las Vegas Motor Speedway, Gase was replaced by Dexter Bean after suffering food poisoning prior to the race. Gase started the race, and was replaced by Bean during the event. On May 2, Gase earned his best career finish, placing fifth in the Winn-Dixie 300 at Talladega.

On January 5, 2018, it was announced Gase would drive the No. 35 Chevrolet Camaro owned by Go Green Racing (the sister team to Go Fas Racing) in the NASCAR Xfinity Series full-time for the 2018 season, even though he left Jimmy Means Racing to seek more opportunities in the Cup Series.

In 2019, Gase joined MBM Motorsports to run the full Xfinity schedule in the team's No. 35 Toyota Supra.

Gase continued to race part-time in the Xfinity Series from 2020 onward. Although much of his 2020 and 2021 schedules were in the Cup Series, he declared for Xfinity points in both seasons, the latter of which came midseason when he switched points in order to run the Talladega Dash 4 Cash race. At Talladega when he drove for Jimmy Means Racing, the car was a Ford which Gase himself had owned.

Cup Series
On August 27, 2014, Gase announced he would make his Sprint Cup Series debut in the No. 32 Ford with Go FAS Racing in the 2014 MyAFibStory.com 400 at Chicagoland. Gase returned in 2015 with Go FAS Racing at Richmond, but finished 43rd after Aric Almirola tapped him, sending him head-on into the SAFER barrier.

In December 2016, Gase joined BK Racing in the No. 23 Toyota Camry for three races starting at the 2017 Daytona 500. In May, he signed with Premium Motorsports to drive the No. 15 at Talladega's GEICO 500. The No. 15 received sponsorship from Sparks Energy, who also sponsored the Talladega Xfinity race. In July, Gase ran the second of his three-race schedule with BK at the Quaker State 400.

In January 2018, it was announced that Gase would also drive a part-time No. 33 Ford for Circle Sport Racing which invested in Go FAS Racing's No. 32 Cup Series Ford. However, the deal fell through. Gase drove at Las Vegas for Premium Motorsports' No. 55, also drove the No. 00 for StarCom Racing at Talladega's spring race and Coke Zero 400 and the No. 23 for BK Racing at Darlington.

In conjunction with his Xfinity ride with MBM for 2019, Gase also joined the team's Cup program, driving the No. 66 Toyota part-time starting with the Daytona 500. For the Digital Ally 400 at Kansas, he drove a second MBM car, the No. 46. In July, Gase drove the No. 53 Chevrolet for Rick Ware Racing in the Coke Zero Sugar 400 at Daytona.

Gase began racing full-time in the Cup Series in 2020 with Ware, though he did not compete for Cup points. For the 2021 GEICO 500 weekend, which included running the Xfinity race, Gase switched to No. 28 and ran a tribute paint scheme to Davey Allison

At the 2021 South Point 400 at Las Vegas Motor Speedway, Gase was involved in a scary crash when his No. 15 RWR car lost a tire and slammed the wall, sending the car airborne. Gase was transported to the hospital and released a few hours later.

Motorsports career results

NASCAR
(key) (Bold – Pole position awarded by qualifying time. Italics – Pole position earned by points standings or practice time. * – Most laps led.)

Cup Series

Daytona 500

Xfinity Series

Camping World Truck Series

K&N Pro Series East

K&N Pro Series West

 Season still in progress
 Ineligible for series points
 Gase started the 2021 season running for Cup Series points, but switched to the Xfinity Series starting at Talladega in April.

ARCA Racing Series
(key) (Bold – Pole position awarded by qualifying time. Italics – Pole position earned by points standings or practice time. * – Most laps led.)

References

External links

Living people
1993 births
Sportspeople from Cedar Rapids, Iowa
Racing drivers from Iowa
NASCAR drivers
CARS Tour drivers
ARCA Midwest Tour drivers
ARCA Menards Series drivers